Cabin Fever is the seventh studio album by Corb Lund and the Hurtin' Albertans. It was released by New West Records on August 14, 2012.

The album was named a longlisted nominee for the 2013 Polaris Music Prize on June 13, 2013.

Track listing

Chart performance

References

2012 albums
Corb Lund and the Hurtin' Albertans albums
New West Records albums